Ryan Whitney (born as Ryan Whitney Newman, April 24, 1998) is an American actress. She is best known for her roles as Ginger Falcone in Disney XD's Zeke and Luther, Allison in The Thundermans, Cindy Collins in Zoom and Emily Hobbs in See Dad Run.

Early life and education 

She attended UCLA and graduated summa cum laude in 2019 with a BA in psychology.

Career 
Ryan made her debut film appearances in the 2006 films Monster House and Zoom. In television, she appeared in several seasons of Disney's hit show Hannah Montana as a young Miley as well as in the Disney Channel Original Series Good Luck Charlie. Later, she appeared as the antagonist Ginger Falcone in Zeke and Luther. In 2010, Ryan won the Young Artist Award for Best Performance in a TV Series by a Leading Actress

In 2012, Ryan was cast as Emily Hobbs on See Dad Run, which premiered on Nick at Nite on October 6, 2012. See Dad Run ran three seasons before ending in 2015. At the end of July 2014 she traveled to Cambodia, supporting Heifer International. In 2015, Ryan was cast in Sharknado 3: Oh Hell No! playing the role of Claudia Shepard, which she took over from Aubrey Peeples, who played the role in Sharknado.

Filmography

Film

Television

Music videos

Awards and nominations

References

External links 

 
 

Living people
Actresses from Los Angeles
American child actresses
American child models
American film actresses
American television actresses
Jewish American actresses
21st-century American actresses
1998 births